Xiong Zhi was the eighth viscount of the state of Chu during the early Zhou Dynasty (1046–256 BC) of ancient China.  Like other early Chu rulers, he held the hereditary noble rank of viscount first granted to his ancestor Xiong Yi by King Cheng of Zhou.

Xiong Zhi succeeded his father Xiong Kang, but later abdicated due to illness.  His younger brother Xiong Yan succeeded him as ruler of Chu, and Xiong Zhi self-exiled and founded the minor state of Kui.

Ancient historian Sima Qian's account of Xiong Zhi in his Records of the Grand Historian (Shiji) is quite confused.  Sima Qian records Xiong Zhi's name variously as Xiong Hong or Xiong Zhihong, and says that he was the second son of Xiong Qu and younger brother of Xiong Kang.  According to Shiji, Xiong Kang died early and Xiong Zhi succeeded Xiong Qu, and that he was killed by his younger brother Xiong Yan.  However, this account is contradicted by earlier historical texts Zuo Zhuan and Guoyu, as well as the recently discovered Tsinghua Bamboo Slips.

References

Monarchs of Chu (state)
Year of birth unknown
Year of death unknown